Metarctia alticola is a moth of the subfamily Arctiinae. It was described by Per Olof Christopher Aurivillius in 1925 and is found in the Democratic Republic of the Congo.

References

Metarctia
Moths described in 1925